The Carnival of São Paulo is a major Brazilian Carnival.  It takes place in the Anhembi Sambadrome of São Paulo on the Friday and Saturday night of the week of Carnival.

No carnival was held in 1915–18, 1940–45 nor since 2021.

References

São Paulo Carnival